FC Frunzenets-Liha-99 Sumy was a football club based in a city of Sumy in Ukraine. The club represented a mechanical engineering factory of the Frunze Science and Production Association in Sumy.

History
The club was founded in 1960 as FC Avanhard Sumy. That used to be a common name of all newly founded football clubs in Ukraine at that time. From 1963 to 1971 the club carried the name of Spartak. In the beginning of the 21st century in Sumy there was a different team under the same name. In 70's the team had a name of Frunzenets. Since 1984 and until 2000 the team plays on the amateur level in the Oblast championship. The club reenter the Druha Liha in 2000 as FC Frunzrenets-Liha-99 Sumy, but in 2002 it merged FC Sumy which earned the promotion to the First League. In 1996 entered the competition of the national cup tournament.

Previous names of the club
 1960–1962 – Football Club Avanhard Sumy
 1963–1971 – Football Club Spartak Sumy
 1972–1989 – Football Club Frunzenets Sumy
 1999–2002 – Football Club Frunzenets-Liha-99 Sumy

References
Summary (in Russian)

See also
FC Spartak Sumy
FC Yavir Krasnopilya
FC Avtomobilist Sumy

 
Frunzenets Sumy, FC
Association football clubs established in 1960
Association football clubs disestablished in 2002
1960 establishments in Ukraine
2002 disestablishments in Ukraine
Football clubs in Sumy